The South Fork Ninnescah River is a river in the central Great Plains of North America. Its entire length lies within the U.S. state of Kansas. It is a tributary of the Ninnescah River.

Geography
The South Fork Ninnescah River originates in south-central Kansas in the High Plains. From there, it flows generally east into the Wellington Lowlands. In southwestern Sedgwick County, it meets the North Fork Ninnescah River to form the Ninnescah River.

See also
List of rivers of Kansas

References

Rivers of Kansas